Joe Munoz is a retired American soccer forward who played professionally in Major League Soccer and the USISL.  He was the 1997 PDSL Playoff MVP.

Youth
Munoz attended California State University, Bakersfield where he played on the men's soccer team from 1994 to 1997.  In 1997, Bakersfield won the NCAA Division II Men's Soccer Championship.  Munoz was a 1996 Division II Second Team and 1997 Division II First Team All American as well as the 1997 NCAA Division II Player of the Year.

Professional
In 1996 and 1997, Munoz played for the Central Coast Roadrunners of the PDSL.  In 1997, the Roadrunners won the league title and Munoz was named the playoff MVP.  On February 1, 1998, the MetroStars selected Munoz in the second round (fifteenth overall) of the 1998 MLS College Draft.  In May, the MetroStars sent him on loan to the Long Island Rough Riders of the USL A-League. He played one game for the MetroStars before being released in June 1998.  He then played for the Chico Rooks from 1998 to 2006.

Coach
Munoz has a doctorate in physical therapy from Loma Linda University and is an assistant coach with the Mendocino College women's soccer team.

References

External links
 
 MetroStars: Joe Munoz

1976 births
Living people
American soccer coaches
American soccer players
Central Coast Roadrunners players
Chico Rooks players
Long Island Rough Riders players
Major League Soccer players
New York Red Bulls players
A-League (1995–2004) players
Sportspeople from Chula Vista, California
USL League Two players
New York Red Bulls draft picks
Mendocino College people
Association football forwards
Association football midfielders
Loma Linda University alumni
Soccer players from California
College women's soccer coaches in the United States